Nuestra Belleza Latina (English: Our Latin beauty) is an American reality television beauty pageant that has been broadcast on Univision from 2007 through 2016, 2018, and 2021. Reunion specials have been conducted in the years 2010, 2016, 2018, and 2020. Nuestra Belleza Latina sees contestants residing in a house together in Miami, Florida, competing in weekly challenges to win the Nuestra Belleza Latina crown. Each week the viewing public votes for their favorites, and one contestant is eliminated. The winner receives a year-long television presenting contract with Univision, among other prizes. Contestants are Hispanic and Latino Americans who are either American citizens or permanent residents.

The current Nuestra Belleza Latina is Sirey Moran from Honduras.

Format
Auditions are held in cities throughout the United States and Puerto Rico for Hispanic and Latino American women. Judges then select anywhere from 12 to 14 finalists to move into the Nuestra Belleza Latina mansion in Miami, Florida, where the contestants reside for the duration of the competition. The finalists receive training in dance, catwalk, speaking, teleprompter reading, and physical fitness, and compete in weekly challenges against each other. Following each episode, the viewing public is allowed to vote for their favorite contestant. The three contestants with the fewest votes are thus put in danger; one is saved by the other contestants, one is saved by the judges, and the third is eliminated from the competition. After a certain number of contestants remain, the audience chooses the winner of the competition. The winner receives various prizes, such as a contract with Univision, a cash prize, and the title of Nuestra Belleza Latina.

Editions

Judges and hosts

Judges

Hosts

References

External links

Nuestra Belleza Latina on TV Time

 
2000s American reality television series
2007 American television series debuts
2007 establishments in the United States
2010s American reality television series
Beauty pageants in the United States
Hispanic and Latino American mass media
Recurring events established in 2007
Spanish-language television programming in the United States
Television shows filmed in Miami
Univision original programming
Women in Florida